Hukmdev Narayan Yadav (born 17 November 1939) is a politician from Bihar, who has been Union Minister of Cabinet Textile and food processing  He is the recipient of Padma Bhushan India's third highest civilian award. He represented the Madhubani constituency of Bihar 1977, 1999, 2009, 2014 and 1989 from Sitamarhi loksabha constituency. He was with Socialist Party in 1960s and various faces of Janata Dal and its off-shoots in 1980s, but later he joined Bharatiya Janata Party. Yadav is known for his fiery speeches in the parliament. In August 2018, Yadav was recipient of Outstanding Parliamentarian Award for 2014-2017 period and was felicitated at an event at the central hall of Parliament.

Education and background
Yadav is a Graduate. An agriculturist by profession, he is also a political figure and a social worker. Along with Indranath Jha, Yadav was very active in Madhubani; after the death of Indranath Jha, he took all the responsibility.

Posts held

See also

List of members of the 15th Lok Sabha of India

References

India MPs 2009–2014
Living people
1939 births
People from Darbhanga district
India MPs 2014–2019
Lok Sabha members from Bihar
Rajya Sabha members from Bihar
Bharatiya Janata Party politicians from Bihar
Janata Dal politicians
India MPs 1977–1979
India MPs 1989–1991
India MPs 1999–2004
Recipients of the Padma Bhushan in public affairs
Lok Dal politicians
Samyukta Socialist Party politicians
Janata Party politicians